Hohenbergiopsis is a genus of plants in the family Bromeliaceae, subfamily Bromelioideae. The genus name is from the genus Hohenbergia and the Greek opsis (resembling) because it resembles the genus Hohenbergia. It contains only one known species, Hohenbergiopsis guatemalensis, native to Oaxaca, Chiapas, and Guatemala.

References

External links
BSI Genera Gallery photos
photographs of Hohenbergiopsis

Bromelioideae
Flora of Guatemala
Flora of Chiapas
Flora of Oaxaca
Bromeliaceae genera
Monotypic Poales genera